"People Will Say We're In Love" is a show tune from the Rodgers and Hammerstein musical, Oklahoma! (1943). In the original Broadway production, the song was introduced by Alfred Drake and Joan Roberts.

Plot context
The other characters think, correctly, that Laurey (Joan Roberts) and Curly (Alfred Drake) are in love. In this song they warn each other not to behave indiscreetly, lest people misinterpret their intentions.  Neither wants to admit to the other his or her true feelings.  Towards the end of the musical the characters reprise the number after becoming engaged, saying "Let people say we're in love."

Covers
This song has been covered by many people, including instrumental versions.  Three versions made the Top 40 charts: Bing Crosby & Trudy Erwin (#2), Frank Sinatra (#3), and The Ink Spots (#11).  
The list of covers includes:

101 Strings Orchestra
The Cannonball Adderley Quintet
Thomas Allen & Valerie Masterson
Eric Alexander
Chet Baker & Gerry Mulligan
Chris Bennett
Emmett Berry
Les Brown and His Band of Renown
Kenny Burrell
Donald Byrd & Doug Watkins
Carmen Cavallaro
Eugene Chadbourne
Ray Charles
Rosemary Clooney
Nat King Cole
George Coleman
Dorothy Collins
Perry Como
Ray Conniff
Bing Crosby & Trudy Erwin - recorded August 23, 1943. 
Doris Day
Eddie "Lockjaw" Davis
Sammy Davis Jr. & Carmen McRae
Trudy Desmond
Lou Donaldson
Herb Ellis & Jimmy Giuffre
Ella Fitzgerald
Helen Forrest
Sergio Franchi - The Songs of Richard Rodgers (1965)
Erroll Garner
Tom Grant
Bennie Green
Dick Haymes
Ted Heath
Fred Hersch
Lena Horne & Lennie Hayton
Leslie Hutchinson
The Ink Spots
Joni James
Jack Jones
Spike Jones and his City Slickers
Roger Kellaway
Stacey Kent - The Boy Next Door (2008)
Lee Konitz
James Last
Peggy Lee
Marcia Lewis
Monica Lewis
Joe Loss Orchestra. Recorded in London on August 19, 1947. Released by EMI on the His Master's Voice label as catalogue number BD 5974
Gordon Macrae and Shirley Jones (film version)
Helen Merrill
Glenn Miller & The Army Air Force Band
Sophie Milman - Make Someone Happy (2007)
Marion Montgomery
Gerry Mulligan
Nigel Ogden
Johnny Otis
Robert Palmer
Ken Peplowski
The Platters
Paul Quinichette
Rita Reys
Nelson Riddle
Spike Robinson
Mathilde Santing & Rita Reys
Frank Sinatra - The Best Of The Columbia Years 1943 - 1952
Johnny Smith
Kate Smith
David Soul & Claire Moore
The Spaniels
Sonny Stitt & Hank Jones
Dick Sudhalter
Tierney Sutton
The Treniers
Lawrence Welk
Andy Williams
Mary Lou Williams
Nancy Wilson
Norma Winstone

Adaptation
In 1959 the British composer Peter Dickinson used part of the music in his Monologue for String Orchestra, principally the melodic line under the lyric "People will say we're in...".

References

1943 songs
Songs with music by Richard Rodgers
Songs with lyrics by Oscar Hammerstein II
Nancy Wilson (jazz singer) songs
Frank Sinatra songs
Andy Williams songs
Songs from Oklahoma!
Shirley Jones songs